Allan Ingraham (born 7 March 1962) is a Bahamian sprinter. He competed in the men's 400 metres at the 1984 Summer Olympics.

References

1962 births
Living people
Athletes (track and field) at the 1984 Summer Olympics
Bahamian male sprinters
Olympic athletes of the Bahamas
World Athletics Championships athletes for the Bahamas
Place of birth missing (living people)